Odin is a concept album about Norse mythology by the German power metal band Wizard.

Track listing
All songs written & arranged by Wizard. All lyrics written by Volker Leson.

"The Prophecy" - 5:19
"Betrayer" - 4:53
"Dead Hope" - 6:02
"Dark God" - 5:43
"Loki's Punishment" - 5:08 
"Beginning of the End" - 4:01
"Thor's Hammer" - 5:01 
"Hall of Odin" - 5:06
"The Powergod" - 5:21
"March of the Einheriers" - 5:40 
"End of All" - 3:53

The limited-edition also contains the following songs:
"Ultimate War" - 4:52
"Golden Dawn" - 5:05

Personnel
 Sven D'Anna – vocals  
 Michael Maass – guitar  
 Volker Leson – bass  
 Sören van Heek – drums

2003 albums
Wizard (German band) albums
Limb Music albums
Concept albums
Norse mythology in music